City Raga is the eighteenth album by Popol Vuh. It was originally released in 1995 on Milan Records.

In this album, Popol Vuh plays a style of music which is similar to bands like Enigma, Deep Forest or Banco de Gaia, mixing electronic music and dance rhythms with ethnic chants and the sampled voice of singer Maya Rose rather than the krautrock, psychedelic rock and ambient music of their previous releases. Because of this, City Raga remains generally a controversial release among Popol Vuh's fanbase.

Track listing 
All tracks composed by Florian Fricke, Guido Hieronymus, and Maya Rose except where noted.

 "Wanted Maya" – 7:00
 "Tears Of Concrete" – 5:30
 "Last Village" (Fricke, Hieronymus) – 7:10
 "City Raga" – 8:10
 "Morning Raga" (Fricke, Daniel Fichelscher, Hieronymus) – 5:40
 "Running Deep" (Fricke, Hieronymus) – 6:00
 "City Raga (Mystic House Mix)" – 6:41

Personnel 
 Florian Fricke – piano
 Guido Hieronymus – keyboards, electric guitar
 Maya Rose – vocals

Guest musicians
 Daniel Fichelscher – acoustic guitar (on 5)
 Children's choir from Kathmandu

Credits 
Recorded at New African Studio, Munich, on June - September 1994 
Product and sound consulting by Johannes Fricke and Gerhard Augustin 
Produced by Florian Fricke and Frank Fiedler

Product management by Hubert Hass

External links 
 https://web.archive.org/web/20081029050641/http://www.furious.com/perfect/populvuh.html (Comprehensive article & review of every album, in English)
 https://web.archive.org/web/20080119183134/http://www.enricobassi.it/popvuhdiscografia90.htm (featuring the original credits)
http://www.venco.com.pl/~acrux/cityraga.htm

Popol Vuh (band) albums
1995 albums